Mees Erasmus (born 16 September 1994) is a South African rugby union player who plays for the Melbourne Rebels inn the Super Rugby competition.  His position of choice is prop.

References

Super Rugby statistics

South African rugby union players
1994 births
Living people
Rugby union players from Johannesburg
Rugby union props
Rugby union hookers
South African expatriate rugby union players
Expatriate rugby union players in Australia
Sharks (Currie Cup) players
Perth Spirit players
ACT Brumbies players
Melbourne Rising players
Melbourne Rebels players
Expatriate rugby union players in France
US Colomiers players
Tarbes Pyrénées Rugby players